The 48th Los Angeles Film Critics Association Awards, given by the Los Angeles Film Critics Association (LAFCA), honored the best in film for 2022. Both Everything Everywhere All at Once and Tár received the award for Best Film, being the fourth time the association gave the award to two films in the same year. For the first time in three years, the organization held an in-person awards event where all the winners were honored on January 14, 2023.

This year, LAFCA introduced gender-neutral acting categories, with two awards for Best Lead Performance and two awards for Best Supporting Performance, each with two winners and two runner-ups.

Winners

 Best Film (TIE):
 Everything Everywhere All at Once
 Tár
 Best Director:
 Todd Field – Tár
 Runner-up: S. S. Rajamouli – RRR
 Best Lead Performance:
 Cate Blanchett – Tár
 Bill Nighy – Living
 Runner-up: Danielle Deadwyler – Till
 Runner-up: Michelle Yeoh – Everything Everywhere All at Once
 Best Supporting Performance:
 Dolly de Leon – Triangle of Sadness
 Ke Huy Quan – Everything Everywhere All at Once
 Runner-up: Jessie Buckley – Women Talking
 Runner-up: Brian Tyree Henry – Causeway
 Best Screenplay:
 Todd Field – Tár
 Runner-up: Martin McDonagh – The Banshees of Inisherin
 Best Cinematography:
 Michał Dymek – EO
 Runner-up: Hoyte van Hoytema – Nope
 Best Editing:
 Blair McClendon – Aftersun
 Runner-up: Monika Willi – Tár
 Best Music Score:
 M. M. Keeravani – RRR
 Runner-up: Paweł Mykietyn – EO
 Best Production Design:
 Dylan Cole and Ben Procter – Avatar: The Way of Water
 Runner-up: Jason Kisvarday – Everything Everywhere All at Once
 Best Foreign Language Film:
 EO
 Runner-up: Saint Omer
 Best Documentary/Non-Fiction Film:
 All the Beauty and the Bloodshed
 Runner-up: Fire of Love
 Best Animation:
 Guillermo del Toro's Pinocchio
 Runner-up: Marcel the Shell with Shoes On
 New Generation Award:
 Davy Chou and Park Ji-Min – Return to Seoul
 Career Achievement Award:
 Claire Denis
 The Douglas Edwards Experimental/Independent Film/Video Award:
 De Humani Corporis Fabrica
 Special Citation:
 Gwen Deglise (for her curation and celebration of cinema in Los Angeles for a quarter-century through the American Cinematheque)

References

External links
 48th Annual Los Angeles Film Critics Association Awards

2022
Los Angeles Film Critics Association Awards
Los Angeles Film Critics Association Awards
Los Angeles Film Critics Association Awards
Los Angeles Film Critics Association Awards